The Federation of Egalitarian Communities (FEC) is a group of egalitarian communities which have joined together with the common purpose of creating a lifestyle based on equality, cooperation, and harmony with the Earth. A central principal of these communities is that in exchange for a members working quota (typically between 35 and 42 hours per week) the community pays for all aspects of their life style.  Members do not typically get salaries; instead, they have small allowances (typically between $75 and $150 per month) with which they may buy luxury items.  They live, work and socialize within the community but are free to leave whenever they would like.

There are six full-member communities in the FEC, all of which share the primary values of egalitarianism, non-violence and income-sharing. Approximately 200 people live in the various communities. The organization offers various programs to its member communities, including outreach, labor exchange and catastrophic health care coverage.

In addition to the full membership, the FEC has lower levels of membership, such as "Allied" or "Community in Dialog".  These are for communities that may share some, but not all of the FEC values, or who are not prepared for full membership.

Principles 

Each of the full-member FEC communities holds the following values:
	
 Holds its land, labor, income and other resources in common
 Assumes responsibility for the needs of its members, receiving the products of their labor and distributing these and all other goods equally, or according to need
 Practices non-violence
 Uses a form of decision making in which members have an equal opportunity to participate, either through consensus, direct vote, or right of appeal or overrule
 Actively works to establish the equality of all people and does not permit discrimination on the basis of race, class, creed, ethnic origin, age, sex, sexual orientation, or gender identity
 Acts to conserve natural resources for present and future generations while striving to continually improve ecological awareness and practice
 Creates processes for group communication and participation and provides an environment which supports people's development.

Current communities 
The following communities are full members of the Federation of Egalitarian Communities:

 Acorn Community in Virginia
 East Wind Community in Missouri
 Sapling Community in Virginia
  Sandhill Community in Missouri
 Twin Oaks Community in Virginia

Communities in Dialog 
The following communities share most or all of the Federation principles and consider full membership as an option for the future.
 Cambia in Virginia
Cotyeldon in New York
East Brook Community Farm in New York
 Le Manoir in Quebec
Open Circle in Virginia
Oran Mor in Missouri
Rainforest Commons in Washington
Stillwater Sanctuary in Missouri
 The Mothership in Oregon

References

External links

Cooperative federations
Cooperatives in the United States